Eduard Admetlla i Lázaro (10 January 1924 – 8 October 2019) was a Spanish scuba diving pioneer, underwater cameraman and photographer, designer of underwater camera housings, designer of a self-contained underwater breathing apparatus (scuba), tester of scuba diving gear for the Nemrod trade mark, writer, director of TV series, explorer and broadcaster.

Biography 
Admetlla was born in Barcelona (Spain) on 10 January 1924. In 1948 at the age of 24, he started scuba diving. Initially he was an underwater fisherman and became a member of the Asociación de Pesca Submarina de Barcelona (APS) in Barcelona. He soon abandoned this activity as he came to the conclusion that being armed was not the way to go underwater. In 1954 he became a founding member of the Centro de Recuperación y de Investigaciones Submarinas (CRIS). Following that he became an underwater photographer and cameraman. He also invented underwater camera housings and was a test diver of scuba diving gear for the Spanish trade mark Nemrod. In 1953 he designed and tested successfully a prototype of a scuba diving breathing device.

He penned five books describing his underwater experiences: La llamada de las profundidades, Mis amigos los peces, ¡Fondo!, Tierras y profundidades and Mi aventura submarina.

As a follower of Hans Hass and Jacques Yves Cousteau's work, Admetlla i Lázar was a Spanish pioneer of underwater photography and filming. The first documentary TV series that he directed was Rumbo sur, filmed in black and white. After this experience he became professional and founded the film production company Volitans Films, S.L., which filmed the TV series: La llamada de las profundidades recorded in the Seychelles Islands; Nuestras islas, filmed in the Balearic Islands and the Canary Islands (Spain) and Tierras y profundidades in the Caribbean. All of these were broadcast by the Spanish television network RTVE. He also recorded the documentary television series La natura en profunditat for the Catalan Television network TV3.

Eduard Admetlla i Lázaro died on 8 October 2019 at the age of 95.

Books 

Admetlla Lázaro, Eduard. La llamada de las profundidades. Editorial Juventud, 1957. Editions 1961, 1999, 2009 and 2010. 

Admetlla Lázaro, Eduard. Mis amigos los peces. Bruguera, 1983. Revised by the author 2010. .

Admetlla Lázaro, Eduard. ¡Fondo! Plaza & Janes, 1976.

Admetlla Lázaro, Eduard. Tierras y profundidades. Bruguera, 1983. .

Admetlla Lázaro, Eduard. Mi aventura submarina. Barcelona: Grijalbo, 1984. .

Television Series

Honours and awards

References

External links 
 
 

Underwater photographers
People from Barcelona
Underwater filmmakers
History of scuba diving
1924 births
2019 deaths